Josephine Gattuso Hendin (born 1944) is an Italian American feminist novelist and critic.

Life
She grew up in Queens and now lives in Manhattan.

She graduated from City College of New York, magna cum laude, and Columbia University with an M.A. in 1965, and Ph.D. in 1968.
She taught at Yale University, and City College of New York.
She teaches at New York University.

Awards
 1975 Guggenheim Fellow
 1989 American Book Award for The Right Thing to Do

Works

   (reprint The Feminist Press, 1999)

Anthologies

References

External links

People from Queens, New York
1944 births
20th-century American novelists
American women novelists
City College of New York alumni
Columbia University alumni
New York University faculty
Yale University faculty
City College of New York faculty
Living people
20th-century American women writers
American writers of Italian descent
American Book Award winners
Novelists from New York (state)
Novelists from Connecticut
American women academics
21st-century American women